Luciana Paula Aymar (born 10 August 1977) is an Argentine retired field hockey player.

She is the only player in history to receive the FIH Player of the Year Award eight times, and she is considered as the best female hockey player of all time. In 2010 she was granted the Platinum Konex Award as the best Hockey player of the last decade in Argentina.

Luciana is known for her ability to beat opposing players using her pace and dribbling skills, drawing comparisons with Argentinian footballer Diego Maradona. For this reason she has received the nicknames "La Maga" ("The Magician") and "The Maradona of Field Hockey".

Aymar was the flag bearer for Argentina at the 2012 Summer Olympics, becoming the second field hockey athlete being honoured this way after Marcelo Garraffo.

Personal Life
Aymar was born to René Aymar and Nilda Vicente de Aymar. She has 3 siblings in Her family: Cintia Aymar, Lucas Aymar and Fernando Aymar. Since 2017, Aymar had been in a relationship with former Chilean professional tennis player Fernando González, and they have two children: a son, Félix, born in 2019, and a daughter, Lupe, born in 2021.

Career
Luciana started playing at age seven for Club Atlético Fisherton in her native Rosario. She moved to Jockey Club de Rosario six years later. She gradually began training with the junior national team, for which she had to travel every day to Buenos Aires. In her international career she played for Rot Weiss Köln from Germany and for Real Club de Barcelona from Spain. In her country, Luciana played for Quilmes Atlético Club and GEBA, where she won La Liga Nacional (The National League) and the Torneo Metropolitano. In 1997 she was part of the Argentina junior team that won the Pan American Games Junior Championship and the bronze medal at the Hockey Junior World Cup and a year later she made her debut for the Argentina senior team, finishing fourth at the 1998 Hockey World Cup. She was the youngest Argentine to be accepted into the squad when she was just 16.

Aymar was part of a generation in Argentine field hockey that went on to win several international tournaments from the 1999 Pan American Games onwards, including four Olympic medals, and six Champions Trophies. She was part of the squad that won the 2002 and 2010 Hockey World Cup, with the latter being held in her hometown Rosario.

In 2008, Luciana was declared Legend of Hockey by International Hockey Federation.

She was the flag bearer for her country at the opening ceremony of the 2007 Pan American Games in Rio de Janeiro, Brazil and at the London 2012 Summer Olympics.

In the 2012 Summer Olympics Luciana became the second Argentine to achieve 4 medals, the first being sportsman Carlos Espínola.

Luciana played her last international game with Argentina on Sunday 7 December 2014, in the city of Mendoza, Argentina, winning her sixth Champions Trophy.

Awards and honours

International

Argentina Junior
Pan American Games: Gold Medal (1997)
Junior World Cup: Bronze Medal (1997)
Argentina
Pan American Games: Gold Medal (1999, 2003, 2007), Silver Medal (2011)
Summer Olympics: Silver Medal (2000, 2012), Bronze Medal (2004, 2008).
Champions Trophy: Gold Medal (2001, 2008, 2009, 2010, 2012, 2014), Silver Medal (2002, 2007, 2011), Bronze Medal (2004)
World Cup: Gold Medal (2002, 2010), Bronze Medal (2006, 2014)

Club
Rot-Weiss Köln
European Club Championship: 1998
Real Club de Polo de Barcelona
Copa de la Reina: 2004
GEBA
Liga Nacional: 2008, 2009
Torneo Metropolitano: 2008, 2009

Individual
Champions Trophy's Player of the Tournament: 2000, 2001, 2003, 2004, 2005, 2008, 2010, 2012, 2014
FIH Player of the Year: 2001, 2004, 2005, 2007, 2008, 2009, 2010, 2013
World Cup's Player of the Tournament: 2002, 2010

References

External links
 

 
 

1977 births
Living people
Argentine female field hockey players
Sportspeople from Rosario, Santa Fe
Argentine people of Spanish descent
Pan American Games gold medalists for Argentina
Pan American Games silver medalists for Argentina
Olympic field hockey players of Argentina
Las Leonas players
Field hockey players at the 2000 Summer Olympics
Field hockey players at the 2004 Summer Olympics
Field hockey players at the 2007 Pan American Games
Field hockey players at the 2008 Summer Olympics
Field hockey players at the 2011 Pan American Games
Olympic silver medalists for Argentina
Olympic bronze medalists for Argentina
Olympic medalists in field hockey
Field hockey players at the 2012 Summer Olympics
Medalists at the 2012 Summer Olympics
Medalists at the 2008 Summer Olympics
Medalists at the 2004 Summer Olympics
Medalists at the 2000 Summer Olympics
Pan American Games medalists in field hockey
Medalists at the 2007 Pan American Games
Medalists at the 2011 Pan American Games
Medalists at the 1999 Pan American Games
Medalists at the 2003 Pan American Games
20th-century Argentine women
21st-century Argentine women